Godmanchester Chinese Bridge is a landmark of the town of Godmanchester, Huntingdonshire (now administered as part of Cambridgeshire, England). It is a pedestrian bridge that spans a mill stream on the River Great Ouse and is, as the name suggests, built in an ostensibly Chinese style. The original was constructed in 1827 to designs by the architect James Gallier, but it fell into a bad condition and was replaced with a replica by the local council in 1960.

The origins of the bridge are somewhat unusual. "Chinese Chippendale" had been a fashion of the mid-18th century, a time when the town was building a mansion for the Receiver General of Huntingdonshire by the river. Island Hall had included a rather smaller Chinese bridge, linking it to an ornamental island. It seems likely that this served as the inspiration for the public bridge several decades later – its white timbers are also in the Chinese Chippendale style.

The bridge was removed by crane on Tuesday 9 February 2010. A replica, built in Yorkshire by CTS Bridges, was put into position on Monday 15th and Tuesday 16 February.

In popular culture
The bridge was the principal subject for the song "Godmanchester Chinese Bridge"  by The Howl & The Hum

References

Bridges in Cambridgeshire
Bridges across the River Great Ouse
Bridges completed in 1827
Bridges completed in 1960
Pedestrian bridges in England
1827 establishments in England
Godmanchester